Eleanor Lambert (August 10, 1903 – October 7, 2003) was an American fashion publicist. She was instrumental in increasing the international prominence of the American fashion industry and in the emergence of New York City as a major fashion capital. Lambert was the founder of New York Fashion Week, the Council of Fashion Designers of America, the Met Gala, and the International Best Dressed List.

Personal life
Lambert was born to a Presbyterian family in Crawfordsville, Indiana. She attended the John Herron School of Art and the Art Institute of Chicago to study fashion.  Lambert wanted to be a sculptor, but instead went into advertising. She started at an advertising agency in Manhattan, dealing mostly with artists and art galleries.

She was married twice, firstly to Wills Conner, in the 1920s, which ended in divorce, and secondly to Seymour Berkson in 1936, which ended with his death in 1959. Lambert and Berkson had one son together, the renowned poet Bill Berkson. She died in Manhattan in New York City.

Career

Lambert moved to New York in 1925 and briefly worked for a Manhattan advertising agency. In the mid 1930s, Lambert was the first press director of the Whitney Museum of American Art and helped with the founding of the Museum of Modern Art and the Art Dealers Association of America. Jackson Pollock, Jacob Epstein, and Isamu Noguchi were a few of the many artists she represented.

In the 1940s, Lambert founded the International Best Dressed List, the Coty Fashion Critics’ Award (which later became the C.F.D.A. Awards), and New York Fashion Week. In 1959 and 1967, she was asked by the US Department of State to present American fashion for the first time in Russia, Germany, Italy, Australia, Japan, Britain, and Switzerland.

In 1965, she was appointed by President Lyndon Johnson to the National Council on the Arts of the National Endowment for the Arts.  In 1962, she organized the Council of Fashion Designers of America (CFDA)  and stayed an honorary member until her death in 2003.

In 2001, the CFDA created The Eleanor Lambert Award, that is presented for a “unique contribution to the world of fashion and/or deserves the industry’s special recognition.”  Months before she died, she had left her International Best Dressed List to four of Vanity Fair’s editors. Shortly after her last public appearance at New York Fashion Week in September, Lambert died in 2003 at the age of 100. Shortly after her death her grandson, Moses Berkson, completed a documentary film about her life.

Fashion historian John A. Tiffany was mentored by Lambert.

One source credited Lambert as "a factor in the gross domestic product of the U.S., and even of the world" for her influence in the fashion industry. Lambert's influence is described as exogenous event risk in mathematical modeling.

In Popular culture 
In the 2021 Netflix miniseries, Halston, Lambert was portrayed by Kelly Bishop.

References

Bibliography
 Ultimate Style: The Best of the Best Dressed List by Eleanor Lambert and Bettina Zilkha (April 2004) 
 World of fashion: People, places, resources (1973) 
 John Loring, Eleanor Lambert, James Galanos: Tiffany in Fashion. Harry N. Abrams Inc., New York NY 2003, .

External links
CFDA website
Vanity Fair feature 2004

1903 births
2003 deaths
American centenarians
American fashion businesspeople
People from Crawfordsville, Indiana
Herron School of Art and Design alumni
Women centenarians